Krempe is a town in the district of Steinburg, in Schleswig-Holstein, Germany. It is situated between Itzehoe and Glückstadt. Krempe is part of the Amt ("collective municipality") Krempermarsch.

Partner towns
 Sankt Martin im Sulmtal in der Steiermark
 Gramzow in der Uckermark, Brandenburg

References

External links
 Web site of the town of Krempe

Towns in Schleswig-Holstein
Steinburg